Proxyphylline is a xanthine derivative that acts as a cardiac stimulant, vasodilator and bronchodilator.

References

Adenosine receptor antagonists
Phosphodiesterase inhibitors
Xanthines